David Glen MM (31 March 1881 – 9 April 1917) was a Scottish amateur footballer, best remembered for his time in the Northern League with Brechin City, for whom he played as a centre forward and was club captain. He also played in the Scottish League for Dundee and was described as "a gentlemanly player, feared by all his opponents for his robust style of play".

Personal life 
In December 1914, four months after Britain's entry into the First World War, Glen enlisted in the Royal Scots. He was posted to the Western Front in August 1915 and was lightly wounded in the stomach and hands in June 1916. He won the Military Medal for bravery and was recommended for the Distinguished Conduct Medal on a number of occasions. On 9 April 1917, Glen was serving as a sergeant when he was killed near Arras during the First Battle of the Scarpe. He was buried in Cabaret-Rouge British Cemetery, Souchez.

Career statistics

Honours 
Brechin City

 Forfarshire Cup: 1909–10

References

1881 births
Scottish footballers
Scottish Football League players
People from Brechin
Association football forwards
Brechin City F.C. players
Royal Scots soldiers
1917 deaths
British Army personnel of World War I
British military personnel killed in World War I
Dundee F.C. players
Millwall F.C. players
Recipients of the Military Medal
Footballers from Angus, Scotland